Manon Bollegraf and Nicole Provis were the defending champions but they competed with different partners that year, Bollegraf with Eva Pfaff and Provis with Elna Reinach.

Bollegraf and Pfaff lost in the first round to Jo-Anne Faull and Rachel McQuillan.

Provis and Reinach lost in the quarterfinals to Neige Dias and Adriana Villagrán.

Mercedes Paz and Judith Wiesner won in the final 6–3, 6–3 against Lise Gregory and Gretchen Magers.

Seeds
Champion seeds are indicated in bold text while text in italics indicates the round in which those seeds were eliminated.

 Manon Bollegraf /  Eva Pfaff (first round)
 Nicole Provis /  Elna Reinach (quarterfinals)
 Mercedes Paz /  Judith Wiesner (champions)
 Nathalie Herreman /  Catherine Suire (quarterfinals)

Draw

External links
 1989 Internationaux de Strasbourg Doubles Draw

1989
1989 WTA Tour
1989 in French tennis